The 2011 AirAsia Renault Clio Cup United Kingdom season will begin at Brands Hatch on 3 April and will finish after 16 races over 8 events at Brands Hatch on 2 October. The season will support rounds of the British Touring Car Championship. On 28 February, AirAsia X was announced as title sponsor to the series in a three-year deal.

Rule changes
The 2011 season will see several rules introduced in an effort to cut costs for competitors to an annual budget of approximately £60,000. These changes including a reduction in the number of rounds from 20 to 16, a reduction in tyre allocation from 60 slick tyres per year to 48 and a reduction of official test days and a freedom of test venue introduced.

Teams and drivers

Race calendar and results
The 2011 ToCA calendar was announced on 8 September 2010. Renault have subsequently announced that the Clio Cup will support the BTCC at eight meetings. Two non-championship races were held at the World Series by Renault meeting at Silverstone in conjunction with the Dutch Clio Cup. Luke Wright won both races for the Scuderia Vittoria team, but he was the only full-time competitor from the British series to take part.

Championship standings

Drivers' Championship

Entrants' Championship

References

Renault Clio Cup United Kingdom
Renault Clio Cup UK seasons